Homeland Security Group is an executive directorate of the UK government Home Office, created in 2007, responsible for leading the work on counter-terrorism in the UK, working closely with the police and security services. The office reports to the Home Secretary, and to the Minister of State for Security and Counter-Terrorism. Its current Director General is Chloe Squires, who is the senior government official responsible for counter-terrorist and organised crime strategy.

Responsibilities
According to its website, the current responsibilities of the OSCT are:

Exercising the UK's response to a terrorist incident
Developing legislation on terrorism here and overseas 
Providing security measures and protection packages for public figures
Ensuring that the UK's critical national infrastructure is protected from attack (including electronic attack)
Ensuring the UK is prepared to deal with a chemical, biological, or nuclear release
Liaising with government and emergency services during terrorist incidents or counter-terrorism operations

In May 2014, the Director General of OSCT made a witness statement on behalf of the government and the three main intelligence agencies for the Investigatory Powers Tribunal, in a legal case brought by advocacy groups including Privacy International, Liberty and Amnesty International, explaining the legal basis for the interception of electronic communications under the Regulation of Investigatory Powers Act 2000. This was characterised in the media as an explanation of how the security services can legally monitor "Facebook, Google and Twitter" usage by UK citizens.

The OSCT has a total staff of 1,061 as of 31st March 2021

Programmes

The Preventing Violent Extremism strategy (Prevent), is a £140 million programme run by OSCT.

In 2013, OSCT stated that 500 people had gone through its Channel deradicalisation programme, including some considering participating in the Syrian civil war, steering some away from violent extremism.

See also 
 Anti-terrorism, Crime and Security Act 2001#Part 11 (Retention of communications data)
 British intelligence agencies
 Communications Data Bill 2008
 Data retention
 Internet censorship in the United Kingdom
 Mastering the Internet
 Patriot Act
 PRISM (surveillance program)
 Regulation of Investigatory Powers Act 2000
 Telecommunications data retention#United Kingdom

References

External links
Policy - Protecting the UK against terrorism, gov.uk, 26 March 2013
Local Government Association Preventing Violent Extremism Conference, Office for Security & Counter Terrorism, Charles Farr

Counterterrorism in the United Kingdom
Home Office (United Kingdom)
National security of the United Kingdom